Jeffrey Evan Sevy (born October 24, 1950) was a lineman for six years in the NFL. In his amateur years, he played at Homestead High School then went to De Anza College before transferring to Cal. He was drafted by the Chicago Bears in the 12th round of the 1974 NFL draft. He played for the Bears for four seasons before ending his NFL career with the Seattle Seahawks in 1979 and 1980. Sevy also played for The Hawaiians of the World Football League in 1974 and the Washington Federals of the USFL in 1983 and 1984.

External links
Player Profile

Living people
1950 births
American football offensive linemen
Chicago Bears players
California Golden Bears football players
The Hawaiians players
De Anza Dons football players
Washington Federals/Orlando Renegades players